The Kobelberg in the municipality of Wiesenfelden in the Bavarian Forest is a forested mountain ridge running from north to south. It lies south of the village of Schiederhof between the source regions of the Großer Leitenbach to the east and the Breimbach to the west. Its three summits have heights of 692 m, 698.3 m und 703 m.

According to a 2014 survey, the Kobelberg is one of 17 possible top sites for a pumped storage hydroelectric station in Bavaria. In the county of Straubing-Bogen the mountains of Pfarrerberg and Hadriwa are also in the frame.

References 

Mountains of Bavaria
Mountains of the Bavarian Forest
Straubing-Bogen
Mountains under 1000 metres